Normandy was a province in the North-West of France under the Ancien Régime which lasted until the later part of the 18th century.  Initially populated by Celtic tribes in the West and Belgic tribes in the North East, it was conquered in AD 98 by the Romans and integrated into the province of Gallia Lugdunensis by Augustus. In the 4th century, Gratian divided the province into the civitates that constitute the historical borders. After the fall of Rome in the 5th century, the Franks became the dominant ethnic group in the area and built several monasteries. Towards the end of the 8th century, Viking raids devastated the region, prompting the establishment of the Duchy of Normandy in 911. After 150 years of expansion, the borders of Normandy reached relative stability. These old borders roughly correspond to the present borders of Lower Normandy, Upper Normandy and the Channel Islands. Mainland Normandy was integrated into the Kingdom of France in 1204. The region was badly damaged during the Hundred Years War and the Wars of Religion, the Normans having more converts to Protestantism than other peoples of France. In the 20th century, D-Day, the 1944 Allied invasion of Western Europe, started in Normandy. In 1956, mainland Normandy was separated into two regions, Lower Normandy and Upper Normandy, which were reunified in 2016.

Prehistory and antiquity

Normandy before the Roman conquest 
Archeological finds, such as cave paintings, prove that humans were present in the region as far back as prehistoric times, especially in Eure and Calvados. The Gouy and Orival cave paintings also testify to humans in Seine-Maritime. Several megaliths can be found throughout Normandy, most of them built in a uniform style.

More is known about Celtic Normandy due to the archeological sources being more numerous and easier to date. As early as the 19th century, local scholars studied archeological sites (especially those of Upper Normandy) and recorded their discoveries. They discovered objects such as the Gallic gilded helmet of Amfreville-sous-les-Monts, made in the 4th century BC, and the iron helmet currently in the Museum of Louviers. They also examined the cemetery at Pîtres, with its urns for cremated remains. The artifacts found at these sites indicate Gallic presence in Normandy as far back as the times of the Hallstatt and La Tène cultures.

Belgae and Celts, known as Gauls, invaded Normandy in successive waves from the 4th to the 3rd centuries BC. Much of our knowledge about this group comes from Julius Caesar's de Bello Gallico. Caesar identified several different groups among the Belgae who occupied separate regions and lived in enclosed agrarian towns. In 57 BC, the Gauls united under Vercingetorix in an attempt to resist the onslaught of Caesar's army. Even after their defeat at Alesia, the people of Normandy continued to fight until 51 BC, the year Caesar completed his conquest of Gaul.

Below is a list of Gallic tribes, whose territories correspond to later Normandy, and their administrative centers:
 Abrincates (Ingena, modern-day Avranches),
 Aulerci Eburovices (Mediolanum, modern-day Evreux),
 Baiocasses (Augustodurum, modern-day Bayeux),
 Calates (Juliobona > modern-day Lillebonne),
 Esuvii (*Uxisama > modern-day Exmes)
 Lexovii (Noviomagus Lexoviorum, modern-day Lisieux),
 Sagii (unknown name, modern-day Sées)
 Unelli (Cosedia, modern-day Coutances),
 Veliocasses (Rotomagus > modern-day Rouen),
 Viducasses (Aragenuae, modern-day Vieux).

Roman Normandy 
 

In 27 BC, Emperor Augustus reorganized the Gallic territories by adding Calètes and Véliocasses to the province of Gallia Lugdunensis, which had its capital at Lyon. The Romanization of Normandy was achieved by the usual methods: Roman roads and a policy of urbanization.

Classicists have knowledge of many Gallo-Roman villas in Normandy, thanks in large part to finds made during construction of the A29 autoroute in Seine-Maritime. These country houses were often laid out according to two major plans. One design features a tall and slender structure with an open façade facing south; the second design is similar to Italian villas, with an organized layout around a square courtyard. The latter can be seen at the villa of Sainte-Marguerite-sur-Mer. The villas were built using local materials: flint, chalk, limestone, brick, and cob. The technique of half-timbering came from this period and Celtic huts. The heating systems of these villas relied on the Roman hypocaust.

Agriculture in the region provided wheat and linen, according to Pliny the Elder. Pliny also noted the presence of fana (small temples with a centered, usually square plan) in great numbers. In antiquity the temples of Évreux made the town an important pilgrimage site, with a forum, Roman baths, a basilica, and a Gallic theatre. Évreux is also notable for the mother goddess statues found in tombs and houses.

Crises in the 3rd century and the Roman loss of Normandy 
In the late 3rd century, barbarian raids devastated Normandy. Traces of fire and hastily buried treasures bear evidence to the degree of insecurity in Northern Gaul. Coastal settlements risked raids by Saxon pirates. The situation was so severe that an entire legion of Sueves was garrisoned at Constantia (in the pagus Constantinus), the administrative center of the Unelli tribe. Batavi were garrisoned at Civitas Baiocasensis (Bayeux ). As a result of Diocletian's reforms, Normandy was detached from Brittany, while remaining within Gallia Lugdunensis. Christianity began to enter the area during this period: Saint Mellonius was supposedly ordained Bishop of Rouen in the mid-3rd century. In 406, Germanic and Alan tribes began invading from the West, while the Saxons subjugated the Norman coast. Eventually in 457, Aegidius established the Domain of Soissons in the area (with its seat the town of the same name Soissons, formerly the seat of the Suessiones), independent of and cut off from the Empire but with citizens nevertheless still considering themselves Roman. His son Syagrius succeeded him in 464 and remained until the kingdom was conquered in 486. Rural villages were abandoned and the remaining "Romans" confined themselves to within urban fortifications. Toponymy suggests that the various barbarian groups had installed themselves and formed alliances and federations already at the end of the 3rd century before the fall of the Western Roman Empire in 476.

Middle Ages

Frankish Normandy 

As early as 486, the area between the Somme and the Loire came under the control of the Frankish lord Clovis. Frankish colonization did not occur on a massive scale, and is evidenced chiefly by cemeteries in Envermeu, Londinieres, Herouvillette, and Douvrend. The place names were chiefly Frankish at this time. The Franks also cut administration and military presence at the local levels. Eventually the eastern region of Normandy became a residence for Merovingian royalty.

The Christianization of the area continued with the construction of cathedrals in the principal cities and churches in minor localities. This establishment of the parishes would continue for a long time. The smaller parishes tended to be located in the plains around Caen while the rural parishes took up more space. Villagers would be buried around the local parish church up until the Carolingian era.

The Neustrian Monarchy developed in the 6th century in the isolated western regions. In the 7th century the Neustrian aristocrats founded several abbeys in the valley of the Seine: Fontenelle in 649, Jumièges about 654, Pavilly, Montivilliers. These abbeys rapidly adopted the Benedictine Rule. They came to possess great quantities of land throughout France, from which they drew considerable income. They therefore became involved in political and dynastic rivalries.

Scandinavian invasions 

Normandy takes its name from the Viking invaders who menaced large parts of Europe towards the end of the 1st millennium in two phases (790–930, then 980–1030). Medieval Latin documents referred to them as Nortmanni, which means "men of the North". This name provides the etymological basis for the modern words "Norman" and "Normandy", with -ia (Normandia, like Neustria, Francia, etc.). After 911, this name replaced the term Neustria, which had formerly been used to describe the region that included Normandy. The other parts of Neustria became known as France (now Île-de-France), Anjou and Champagne. The rate of Scandinavian colonization can be seen in the Norman toponymy and in the changes in popular family names. Today, nordmann (pron. norman) in the Norwegian language denotes a Norwegian person.

The first Viking raids began between 790 and 800 on the coasts of western France. Several coastal areas were lost during the reign of Louis the Pious (814–840). The incursions in 841 caused severe damage to Rouen and Jumièges. The Viking attackers sought to capture the treasures stored at monasteries - easy prey considering monks were generally unable to put up much if any resistance. An expedition in 845 went up the Seine and reached Paris. The raids took place primarily in the summers, with the Vikings initially wintering in Scandinavia.

After 851, Vikings began to stay in the lower Seine valley for the winter. In January 852, they burned the Abbey of Fontenelle. The monks who were still alive fled to Boulogne-sur-Mer in 858 and then to Chartres in 885. The relics of Sainte Honorine were transported from Graville to Conflans, which became Conflans-Sainte-Honorine in the Paris region, safer by virtue of its southeasterly location. The monks also attempted to move their archives and monastic libraries to the south, but several were burned by the Vikings.

The Carolingian kings in power at the time tended to have contradictory politics, which had severe consequences. In 867, Charles the Bald signed the Treaty of Compiègne, by which he agreed to yield the Cotentin Peninsula (and probably the Avranchin) to the Breton king Salomon, on condition that Salomon would take an oath of fidelity and fight as an ally against the Vikings. After being defeated by the Franks (led by Robert I of France) at the Battle of Chartres in 911, the Viking leader Rollo and the Frankish King Charles the Simple signed the Treaty of Saint-Clair-sur-Epte, under which Charles gave Rouen and the area of present-day Upper Normandy to Rollo, establishing the Duchy of Normandy. In exchange, Rollo pledged vassalage to Charles and agreed to baptism. Robert I stood as godfather during Rollo's baptism. Rollo vowed to guard the estuaries of the Seine from further Viking attacks.

With a series of conquests, the territory of Normandy gradually expanded: Hiémois and Bessin were taken in 924, the Cotentin and a part of Avranchin followed in 933. That year, King Raoul of France was forced to give Cotentin and a part of Avranchin to William I of Normandy, essentially all lands north of the river Sélune which the Breton dukes had theoretically controlled for about the previous 70 years. Between 1009 and 1020, the Normans continued their westward expansion, taking all the land between the rivers Sélune and Couesnon, including Mont Saint-Michel, and completing the conquest of Avranchin. William the Conqueror completed these campaigns in 1050 by taking Passais. Logically, the Norman rulers (first counts of Rouen and then dukes of Normandy) tried to bring about the political unification of the two different Viking settlements of pays de Caux-lower Seine in the east and Cotentin in the west. Furthermore, Rollo re-established the archbishopric of Rouen and wanted to restore the traditional limits of his archbishopric in the west, that had always included Cotentin and Avranchin.

While Viking raiders pillaged, burned, or destroyed many buildings, it is likely that ecclesiastical sources give an unfairly negative picture: no city was completely destroyed. On the other hand, many monasteries were pillaged and all the abbeys were destroyed. Nevertheless, the activities of Rollo and his successors had the effect of bringing about a rapid recovery.

The Scandinavian colonisation was principally Danish under the Norwegian leadership of Rollo, the colonization also had a Norwegian element in the Cotentin region. For instance, the first name Barno is mentioned in two different documents before 1066 and clearly represents the "frankization" of the Old Scandinavian personal name Barni, only found in Denmark and in England during the Viking Era. It can be identified in many Norman place-names too, such as Barneville-sur-Seine, Banneville, etc. and in England: Barnby. On the other hand, the presence of Norwegians has left traces in the Cotentin:

 indirectly: there are toponyms created with typical Celtic anthroponyms from Ireland or Scotland, which are reputed to have been occupied by Norwegian Vikings, for instance: Doncanville (Duncan) or Digulleville (Dicuil cf. Digulstonga, Iceland)
 directly: the coastal route from the Orkney Islands down to the Cotentin peninsula is marked by rocks and cliffs with typical Norwegian names.

A few Swedes may have also come to Normandy.

The Viking colonisation was not a mass phenomenon. Nevertheless, in some areas, the Scandinavians established themselves rather densely, particularly in pays de Caux and in the northern part of the Cotentin. In fact, one can qualify the Nordic settlements in Normandy as Anglo-Scandinavian, because most of the colonists must have come after 911 as fishermen and farmers from the English Danelaw and a consequent Anglo-Saxon influence can be detected. Toponymic and linguistic evidence survives in support of this theory: for instance Dénestanville (Dunestanvilla in 1142, PN Dunstān > Dunstan) or Vénestanville (Wenestanvillam 13th century, Wynstān > Winston). Furthermore, the Anglo-Saxon Chronicle mentions three times the possible settlement of Danes from England in Neustria:

 A Danish army stationed in Kent for three years finally broke up, and while some Danes stayed in England, others who owned ships sailed over the Channel to the Seine River.
 Later, it is told that the jarl Thurcytel (Thorketill cf. NPN Turquetil, Teurquetil), who first settled in the English Midlands, sailed to Francia in 920.
 Around 1000 another Viking fleet left England for Normandy.

Archeological evidence can be added: some Anglo-Saxon swords were dredged out of the Seine River, they had probably been used by the Danes. More recently, a buried treasure hoard discovered at Saint-Pierre-des-Fleurs contained nine Anglo-Saxon coins with traces of blows to test the metal quality of the coins.

The merging of the Scandinavian and native elements contributed to the creation of one of the most powerful feudal states of Western Europe. The naval ability of the Normans would allow them to conquer England and to participate in the Crusades.

Ducal Normandy (10th to 13th centuries)

Historians have few sources of information for this period of Norman history: Dudo of Saint-Quentin, William of Jumièges, Orderic Vitalis, Flodoard of Reims, Richerus and Wace. Diplomatic messages are the primary source of information for the succession of dukes.

Rollo of Normandy was the chief – the "jarl" – of the Viking population. After 911, he was the count of Rouen. His successors gained the title Duke of Normandy from Richard II. After the rise of the Capetian dynasty, they were forced to vacate the title, for there could be only one duke in Neustria, and the Robertians carried the title. These dukes increased the strength of Normandy, although they had to observe the superiority of the King of France. The dukes of Normandy did not resist the general trend of monopolizing authority over their territory: the dukes struck their own money, rendered justice, and levied taxes. They raised their own armies and named the bulk of prelates of their archdiocese. They were therefore practically independent of the French king, although they paid homage to each new monarch.

The dukes maintained relations with foreign monarchs, especially the king of England: Emma, sister of Richard II married King Ethelred II of England. They appointed family members to positions as counts and viscounts, which came about around the year 1000. They held on to some territory in Scandinavia and the right to enter those lands by sea. The Norman dukes also ensured that their vassal lords did not get too powerful, lest they become a threat to the ducal authority. The Norman dukes thus had more authority over their own domains than other territorial princes in northern France. Their wealth thus enabled them to give large tracts of land to the abbeys and to ensure the loyalty of their vassals with gifts of fiefdoms. William's conquest of England opened up more land to the dukes, allowing them to continue these practices whilst preserving sufficient land holdings to serve as their powerbase.

The course of the 11th century did not have any strict organizations and was somewhat chaotic. The great lords made oaths of fidelity to the heir of the duchy, and were in return granted public and ecclesiastical authority. The justice system lacked a central governing body and written laws were uncommon.

The aristocracy was composed of a small group of Scandinavian men, while the majority of the Norman political leaders were of Frankish descent. At the start of the 11th century, the region was attacked by the Bretons from the West, the Germans from the East, and the people of Anjou from the South. All of the aristocrats' fidelity oaths to the Norman dukes were attributed to defending their important domains. As early as 1040, the term ‘baron’ indicated the elite knights and soldiers of the duke. On the other hand, the term ‘vassal’ does not appear in the documents from 1057 onwards. It was also in the middle of the 11th century that fiefdoms came to exist. Richard the First designated fiefdoms to counts from the dynasty and the cities so as to prevent them from getting too powerful.

Later Middle Ages
Having little confidence in the loyalty of the Normans, Philip installed French administrators and built a powerful fortress, the Château de Rouen, as a symbol of royal power. Within the royal demesne, Normandy retained certain distinctive features. Norman law continued to serve as the basis for court decisions. In 1315, faced with the constant encroachments of royal power on the liberties of Normandy, the barons and towns pressed on the king the Norman Charter. While this document did not provide autonomy to the province, it protected it against arbitrary royal acts. The judgments of the Exchequer, the main court of Normandy, were declared final. This meant that Paris could not reverse a judgement of Rouen. Another important concession was that the King of France could not raise a new tax without the consent of the Normans. However, the charter, granted at a time when royal authority was faltering, was violated several times thereafter when the monarchy had regained its power.

The Duchy of Normandy survived mainly by the intermittent installation of a duke. In practice, the King of France sometimes gave that portion of his kingdom to a close member of his family, who then did homage to the king. Philippe VI made Jean, his eldest son and heir to his throne, the Duke of Normandy. In turn, Jean II appointed his heir, Charles, who was also known by his title of Dauphin.

In 1465, Louis XI was forced by his nobles to cede the duchy to his eighteen-year-old brother Charles, as an appanage. This concession was a problem for the king since Charles was the puppet of the king's enemies. Normandy could thus serve as a basis for rebellion against the royal power. Louis XI therefore agreed with his brother to exchange Normandy for the Duchy of Guyenne (Aquitaine). Finally, to signify that Normandy would not be ceded again, on 9 November 1469 the ducal ring was placed on an anvil and smashed. This was the definitive end of the duchy on the continent.

Modern history

18th and 19th centuries
Although agriculture remained important, industries such as weaving, metallurgy, sugar refining, ceramics, and shipbuilding were introduced and developed.

In the 1780s, the economic crisis and the crisis of the Ancien Régime struck Normandy as well as other parts of the nation, leading to the French Revolution. Bad harvests, technical progress and the effects of the Eden Agreement signed in 1786 affected employment and the economy of the province. Normans laboured under a heavy fiscal burden.

Dauphin Louis Charles, the second son of Louis XVI, was again given the nominal title of 'Duke of Normandy' before the death of his elder brother in 1789.

In 1790, the five departments of Normandy replaced the former province.
11 July 1793, the Norman Charlotte Corday assassinated Marat.

The Normans reacted little to the many political upheavals that characterised the 19th century. Overall, they warily accepted the changes of régime (First French Empire, Bourbon Restoration, July Monarchy, French Second Republic, Second French Empire, French Third Republic).

There was an economic revival (mechanization of textile manufacture, first trains...) after the French Revolutionary Wars and the Napoleonic Wars (1792–1815).

And new economic activity stimulated the coasts: seaside tourism. The 19th century marks the birth of the first beach resorts.

Second World War

During the Second World War, following the armistice of 22 June 1940, continental Normandy was part of the German occupied zone of France. The Channel Islands were occupied by German forces between 30 June 1940 and 9 May 1945. The town of Dieppe was the site of the unsuccessful Dieppe Raid by Canadian and British armed forces.

The Allies in this case involving Britain, the U.S, and Canada coordinated a massive build-up of troops and supplies to support a large-scale invasion of Normandy in the D-Day landings on 6 June 1944 under the code name Operation Overlord. The Germans were dug into fortified emplacements above the beaches. Caen, Cherbourg, Carentan, Falaise and other Norman towns endured many casualties in the Battle of Normandy, which continued until the closing of the so-called Falaise gap between Chambois and Mont Ormel. The liberation of Le Havre followed.

This was a significant turning point in the war and led to the restoration of the French Republic. The remainder of Normandy was liberated only on 9 May 1945 at the end of the war, when the Occupation of the Channel Islands effectively ended.

See also
Charles the Bald
Danegeld
Æthelred the Unready
History of Lower Normandy
 Timeline of Caen
 Timeline of Le Havre
 Timeline of Rouen

References

External links
History of the battle of Normandy at memorial-montormel.org

 
Normandy
Vikings